The 1915 Arkansas Razorbacks football team represented the University of Arkansas in the Southwest Conference (SWC) during the 1915 college football season. In their first year under head coach T. T. McConnell, the Razorbacks compiled a 4–2–1 record (1–1 against SWC opponents), finished in fifth place in the SWC, and outscored their opponents by a combined total of 121 to 55.

Schedule

References

Arkansas
Arkansas Razorbacks football seasons
Arkansas Razorbacks football